Tu’i Nayau is the title held by the paramount chief of the Lau Islands in Fiji and is synonymous with the title holders over lordship of these islands. When translated, Tu’i Nayau means "Lord of Nayau", an island north of Lakeba, the latter accepted by many to be the chief island in the Lauan archipelago. Prior to being installed as Tu’i Nayau, the claimant must first be confirmed upon the decision of the noble households making up the Vuanirewa clan and then installed Sau or High Chief of Lau. Not every Sau has been installed Tu’i Nayau.

Origins of the title
Tu’i Nayau was originally an independent title referring specifically to the overlord of Nayau, then separate from the Lakeba State.

The earliest oral records suggest that the progenitor of the leading family of Nayau stemmed from Naosara, celebrated chief who had won the infamous Cici Turaga, but was not accepted by his older brothers and relatives as he was the youngest in that race. Naosara had sons Buivaroro and Kalouyalewa.

The rise of the Vuanirewa Dynasty
The period after the death of Chief Niumataiwalu in Ono-i-Lau can be assumed to have followed with the conquest of Lakeba by the Levuka people from Bau and supplanting the supremacy of the Cekena dynasty in the Lakeba State with a dictatorship under the heavy hand of the Levuka peoples’ leader, Codro. Before this occurred, Niumatawalu's surviving sons had fled and sought refuge with their relatives.

It was during this exile on Nayau when Rasolo, Niumataiwalu's son set up his foundations near a rewa (Cerbera manghas) tree. The name Vuanirewa comes into existence. With the passing of Vukinavanua, an ensuing dispute among the nobles over who should succeed him arose. According to oral history, the high priest intervened by taking all claimants to the top towering cliffs called Delaiwawa and indicated that the only one to leap from the cliff and live would be worthy to succeed to the title. It is here that Rasolo enters into the legend, as he is the only one who takes up the challenge, leaps and survives.

Installed as Tu’i Nayau, Rasolo was approached by the Lakeba people to free them from Codro's tyrannical rule. It is said Rasolo allowed himself to be approached three times before agreeing to their request. He and his brother Matawalu then lead an army with supporting Lakeba forces which routed and expelled Codro and the Levuka people. With this triumph Rasolo was brought over from Nayau and installed as Roko Sau, in which the whole of Lakeba took part.

Rasolo was succeeded by his brother Matawalu, who hated his brother's wife Laufitu. He removed himself to Bau for a long period, allowing for his nephew Dranivia, son of Uluilakeba I to seize power. Matawalu upon hearing this returned to Lakeba, reasserted his authority, whilst his nephew fled to Nayau. This point takes a dramatic and dark turn in the history of the Vuanirewa as Malani, Rasolo's son concerned with the anti-Tongan attitude of his uncle and fear for his mother's people well-being, took the opportunity of Dranivia's expulsion to lead a coup that lead to kin slaying and the death of Matawalu. Matawalu's death again heralded Dranivia's return, but his attempt at taking Lakeba was thwarted, with the support of Malani's Nayau relative Delailoa, on whom he bestowed the name Lagonilakeba in gratitude.

Succession rules
The Vuanirewa unwritten rules on succession tend to follow the following three principles:
 The general custom of passing from elder to younger brother until that generation is extinct, then taking the next generation in the same order through the two households of Matailakeba or Vatuwaqa.
 The tendency to alternate between the two noble households, Matailakeba and Vatuwaqa, with the exclusion of Naivi and Koroicumu
 The tendency to recognize superior nobility of the senior branch of the two households, Matailakeba and Vatuwaqa.

Installation ceremony
The installation ceremony of the Tu’i Nayau takes place in Maumi, on top of the mountain called Delaiwawa on the island of Nayau. The ceremony is performed by the Master of Ceremonies and the leaders from the three villages in the island of Nayau. After the ceremony chief has a special area to bath for four days. The place is called Muaituraga, located close to the village of Narocivo.

Recent history
The most recent Tu’i Nayau was Sir Kamisese Mara, who was installed in 1969 and died in 2004. He belonged to the noble household Matailakeba and his son, Ratu Finau Mara is the current heir to this title. Although there was an initial speculation that the title might be taken up by a member of the noble household Vatuwaqa, this has since been refuted with the Vuanirewa elders having confirmed Finau's candidacy in 2005. No installation date has been confirmed as of 2007. Ratu Mara was the first Tui Nayau to also hold the title Tui Lau.

Tu’i Nayau Consort
When the Tui Nayau is traditionally installed, his wife or in the past his senior wife was likewise installed with him and bore the title Radini Nayau or "Lady of Nayau". The most recent Radini Nayau was the Roko Tui Dreketi, Lady Lala Mara.

List of the title holders 
The table below lists the individuals who have held the title of Roko Sau.

References

External links
 Tui Nayau

 
Tui Nayau
Tui Nayau
Tui Nayau